Axel Gustafsson Oxenstierna of Södermöre (1583–1654), Count of Södermöre, was a Swedish statesman. He became a member of the Swedish Privy Council in 1609 and served as Lord High Chancellor of Sweden from 1612 until his death. He was a confidant of King Gustavus Adolphus and then Queen Christina, of whom he was at first regent. 

Oxenstierna is widely considered one of the most influential people in Swedish history. He played an important role during the Thirty Years' War and was appointed Governor-General of occupied Prussia; he is also credited for having laid the foundations of the modern central administrative structure of the State, including the creation of counties.

Early life and education
Oxenstierna was born on 16 June 1583, at Fånö in Uppland, the son of Gustaf Gabrielsson Oxenstierna (1551–1597) and Barbro Axelsdotter Bielke (1556–1624), as the oldest of nine siblings. His parents belonged to the ancient and influential high noble families of Oxenstierna and Bielke, both of which had held high offices in the state and the church for generations. After the death of her husband Gustaf, Axel's mother Barbro decided to let Axel and his brothers Christer and Gustaf finish their studies abroad. Thus, the brothers received their education at the universities of Rostock, Wittenberg and Jena. On returning home in 1603 he took up an appointment as valet de chambre (kammarjunkare) to King Charles IX of Sweden.

One of Oxenstierna's more unusual intellectual qualifications was his knowledge of the Scots language, reflecting the importance of the Scottish expatriate community in Sweden at that time. As Chancellor, he would regularly receive correspondence in Scots from his agent Sir James Spens, and he ventured into the language himself for an official letter to his Scottish counterpart, the Earl of Loudoun.

Career

1606–1611: Diplomat and Privy Councillor
In 1606 he undertook his first diplomatic mission, to Mecklenburg and other German royal courts. While on diplomatic duty abroad, Oxenstierna gained appointment to the Privy Council (Riksrådet). Henceforth, Oxenstierna became one of the king's most trusted servants. In 1609 he travelled to Reval (present day Tallinn), on King Charles's behalf, to receive tributes from the city of Reval and the Estonian knighthood. Together with other councillors, Oxenstierna tried to warn the king of Denmark and the intentions of Danish King Christian IV. In 1610, Oxenstierna travelled to Copenhagen with the aim of preventing war with the neighbours, but unsuccessfully. The following year, Danish forces crossed the border, initiating the Kalmar War. In the fall of 1611, King Charles died. Around New Year 1611–12, the parliament had to deal with the situation. According to the rules, the 17-year-old Gustavus Adolphus had not reached the proper age to be considered adult enough to rule as king. However, the estates agreed to disregard those rules. In return, the young king agreed to ensure the nobles further privileges and appoint Axel Oxenstierna Lord High Chancellor of Sweden.

1612–1629: Lord High Chancellor and Governor-General
On 6 January 1612 Oxenstierna became Lord High Chancellor (Rikskansler) of the Privy Council. His controlling, organizing hand soon became apparent in every branch of the administration. Sweden was at the time troubled by three wars against Denmark (Kalmar War), Poland-Lithuania (Polish-Swedish War) and Russia (Ingrian War). Oxenstierna's first big task as Chancellor was to achieve peace in some of the wars. The war against Denmark was considered the most dangerous of the three as the enemy-controlled parts of Sweden itself. Negotiations began in Knäred and Oxenstierna was first Swedish plenipotentiary. The negotiations led to the Treaty of Knäred in 1613. For his efforts regarding these negotiations, Oxenstierna received the title of district judge in the hundred of Snävringe and, eventually, the barony of Kimito.

During the frequent absences of Gustavus in Livonia and in Finland (1614–1616) Oxenstierna acted as his viceroy. One assignment Oxenstierna received while the king was in Livonia, was the task to finalize the negotiations regarding the marriage of John Casimir and the king's sister, Princess Catharina. At the coronation of Gustavus Adolphus, in October 1617, Oxenstierna was knighted. In 1620 he headed the embassy dispatched to Berlin to arrange the nuptial contract between Gustavus and Maria Eleonora of Brandenburg. During the king's Russian and Polish wars he had the principal duty of supplying the armies and the fleets with everything necessary, including men and money. Oxenstierna's ways of carrying out his assignments apparently gained King Gustavus's appreciation, since the king, in 1622, asked Oxenstierna to accompany him to Livonia and appointed him Governor-General and commandant of Riga, a strategically important town during the ongoing war against Poland. His services in Livonia gained him the reward of four castles (among others Burtnieki and Valmiera) and the whole bishopric of Wenden. Entrusted with the peace negotiations which led to the truce with Poland in 1623, he succeeded in averting a threatened rupture with Denmark in 1624. The Polish-Swedish War was reinitiated in 1626, and on 7 October that year, Oxenstierna became Governor-General in the newly acquired Swedish possession of Prussia. In 1629 he concluded the advantageous Truce of Altmark with Poland-Lithuania. Prior to this, in September 1628, he arranged a joint occupation of Stralsund with Denmark to prevent that important fortress from falling into the hands of the Imperialists.

Oxenstierna was not only highly successful within the diplomacy. During these years, he was entrusted with various important assignments in which he succeeded, such as gathering money and troops for the attack in Prussia in 1626. He played the leading organizational and administrational role in Prussia, as he had done earlier in Livonia. He was in charge of, for example, tolls, fortifications and the entire state grain trade. During the latter part of the 1620s, Elbląg (German: Elbing), where Oxenstierna resided and from where he governed the Swedish parts of Prussia, became a major Swedish centre of power, second only to Stockholm.

1630–1636: Oxenstierna in the Thirty Years' War
When Sweden entered the Thirty Years' War in the summer of 1630, tolls from Oxenstierna-controlled Prussia, as well as food supplies acquired by Oxenstierna, were pivotal assets. He had also obtained credits from foreign businessmen, ensuring large sums of money making it possible to hire mercenary soldiers to the army used in Germany.

After the Battle of Breitenfeld on 7 September 1631, Oxenstierna received a summons to assist the king with his counsels and co-operation in Germany. During the king's absence in Franconia and Bavaria in 1632 he held the appointment of legatus in the Rhineland, with plenipotentiary authority over all the German generals and princes in the Swedish service. Although he never fought a battle, he frustrated all the efforts of the Spanish troops by using strategically successful regulations. He managed to conduct large reinforcements to King Gustavus through the heart of Germany in the summer of 1632.

In the Battle of Lützen (1632), on 6 November 1632, Gustavus Adolphus died. This meant that Oxenstierna became supreme commander of the Swedish troops in Germany, although he let his subordinate generals be responsible for the military operations on a lower level. He moved his headquarters to Mainz, which in practice became the new Swedish capital. Oxenstierna was now absolute ruler of the significant area that the Swedish army had conquered in Germany. He was offered the position as prince-elector of Mainz, but, after serious considerations, the offer was turned down.

When King Gustavus died in November 1632, his only legitimate and surviving child, Christina, was almost six years old. Until her declaration of majority at 18, a regency council ruled Sweden. This council was headed by Lord High Chancellor Oxenstierna, who wrote Instrument of Government (1634), a new constitution. During the years after the king's death, it became apparent that differences of opinion existed within the council. Some of Oxenstierna's colleagues recommended that Sweden should seek peace and withdraw from the war in Germany, not least after the defeat at Nördlingen in 1634. However, Oxenstierna's opinion, that Sweden should remain in the war to ensure compensation for the sacrifices made, prevailed. The, for the Swedish side, disastrous outcome at Nördlingen brought him, for an instant, to the verge of ruin and compelled him for the first time so far to depart from his policy of independence as to solicit direct assistance from France. But, well aware that Richelieu needed the Swedish armies as much as he himself needed money, he refused at the Conference of Compiègne in 1635 to bind his hands in the future for the sake of some slight present relief. In 1636, nevertheless, he concluded a fresh subsidy-treaty with France at Wismar. Swedish troops remained in Germany all the way until 1648 and the Thirty Years' War's end. Oxenstierna, however, left Germany and returned to Stockholm in 1636, after ten years duty as premier Swedish representative in Prussia and Germany.

1636–1654: Back in Sweden
Oxenstierna more directly claimed his place within the regency of Queen Christina and became the young queen's teacher in statesmanship. His presence at home dominated all opposition, and such was the general confidence for Oxenstierna, that for the next nine years his voice, especially as regarding foreign affairs, remained omnipotent in the Privy Council.

Torstenson War
In May 1643, the Swedish Privy Council decided to attack Denmark. The Torstenson War was at large parts the work of Oxenstierna. The purpose was to gain territories from Denmark and be released from the Danish Sound Dues. Other factors might have been a will to revenge the tough peace Treaty of Knäred in 1613. Whatever the reason, Oxenstierna considered the time was right to finally settle the score with Denmark. Swedish troops led by Field Marshal Lennart Torstensson attacked Danish Jutland from Germany, while Field Marshal Gustav Horn was in charge of the troops that attacked Scania. The outcome of the war was decided in the naval battle of Fehmarn Belt in 1644 where the Royal Swedish Navy decisively defeated the Danish Navy. The defeat of the Danish Navy left the Danish isles open to a Swedish invasion, and Denmark sued for peace. Oxenstierna was personally involved in the negotiations leading to the Treaty of Brömsebro, with which Sweden gained Gotland, Saaremaa (Ösel), Jämtland, Härjedalen and for thirty years Halland. Shortly after the peace treaty, Oxenstierna was created Count of Södermöre.

Queen Christina and her abdication
When Christina came of age, she tried to push Oxenstierna, her old mentor, aside. The relations between the two were not good and Oxenstierna always attributed the exiguousness of Sweden's gains under the Peace of Westphalia − Sweden gained only Western Pomerania, Usedom, Wollin, Wismar and Bremen-Verden − following the conference in Osnabrück to Christina's undue interference. When the queen, a few years later, wanted to abdicate, Oxenstierna at first opposed this because he feared mischief to Sweden from the unruly and adventurous disposition of her preferred successor, Charles X Gustav. The chancellor changed his mind about Charles Gustav, however, and gave Christina the help she needed to go through with her abdication. Oxenstierna died a couple of months after the ascension of the new king.

Death

Oxenstierna died in Stockholm on 28 August 1654. He was interred in Storkyrkan, Stockholm on 18 March 1655. His body was then moved to Jäder Church close to the Oxenstierna estate at Fiholm, in present-day Eskilstuna Municipality, where a vault had been built in accordance with his wishes. In the vault, Oxenstiernska gravvalvet, several members of the Oxenstierna family have been buried, including Axel and his spouse Anna.

Personal life

Family

On 5 June 1608 Axel Oxenstierna married Anna Åkesdotter Bååt, the daughter of nobleman Åke Johansson Bååt and Christina Trolle. The wedding took place at Fiholm Castle, owned by the Oxenstierna family. They had 13 children, of which five survived their childhoods:
Gustaf (29 March 16091629), the oldest child, became a chamberlain.
Johan (born and died 17 June 1610).
Johan (24 June 16115 December 1657), named after his deceased brother, became a privy councillor.
Christina (29 June 16128 August 1631), married Gustav Horn, Field Marshal and Lord High Constable.
Catharina (29 June 161225 June 1661), twin with Christina, married Johan Jespersson Cruus.
Beata (22 November 161315 January 1617).
Barbro (12 February 161521 June 1617).
Åke (March 16161617).
Son (1617), either stillborn or died immediately after birth.
Maria (born and died August 1618).
Gabriel (born and died March 1620).
Jakob (30 July 1621August 1621).
Erik (13 January 162423 October 1656), served as a Lord High Chancellor after the death of his father Axel in 1654.

Axel Oxenstierna's wife Anna died in 1649.

Properties
Oxenstierna was in possession of large estates and many mansions. During his life he owned palaces in, among others, Estonian Otepää, in Latvian Burtnieki, Ropaži and Valmiera, in Finnish Nousiainen (Nousis) and in Stockholm (Oxenstiernska Palace). The foremost of the mansions was Tidö Castle in Västmanland.

Impact and legacy

The modernization of Sweden
Axel Oxenstierna is perhaps most remembered for the establishment of a uniform administrative system. He was ever-present during the vast reforms of the 1610s and 1620s, when the Swedish government was hugely modernized and made more effective. This was necessary for the war policies that would build the Swedish Empire. Among the areas reformed were army and navy organization and recruiting, trade and industrial policies, regional and local administration, the system of higher education, and the judicial system. The boundaries of the administrative counties of Sweden still to a large extent follow the boundaries established by Oxenstierna in the 17th century.

Relationship with King Gustavus Adolphus
Oxenstierna would not have had such an impact unless he had won the king's trust. From 1612, when Oxenstierna was appointed Lord High Chancellor, until 1632, when King Gustavus Adolphus died, the two men struck a long and successful partnership. They seem to have complemented each other. With Oxenstierna's own words, his "cool" balanced the king's "heat". More than once, the chancellor had to realize plans of the king, plans that sometimes were highly spontaneous and far from ready to be implemented in reality. When it came to entering the Thirty Years' War, Oxenstierna was not as enthusiastic as the king, but since the king's will was decisive, Oxenstierna accommodated himself to Gustavus's wish. At times, Oxenstierna stepped in to ease tense relations that the harsh behaviour of the king had caused. He regularly received the highest praise for his work from the king and there was almost no area in which King Gustavus did not consult his Lord High Chancellor Oxenstierna.

The mind behind the Instrument of Government of 1634
The Chancellor made large contributions to the Standing orders of the House of Knights (riddarhusordning) of 1626. After the death of Gustavus Adolphus, Oxenstierna was the mind behind the Instrument of Government of 1634, in which, for example, the organization of the five Great Officers of the Realm was clarified. Five governmental branches, of which the Great Officers became heads, were established. Oxenstierna pushed through the Instrument of Government, but not without opposition. He claimed that the new form of government reflected the will of the late King Gustavus, making himself the interpreter of the king's thoughts and wishes, and leaving the opposition no possibility to control the truth in this.

Opinions
Oxenstierna is regarded as a brilliant pragmatist, willing to reconsider his positions. There are examples of discussions within the Privy Council when Oxenstierna rejected laws he himself had earlier introduced, admitting that he knew better now. His way of examining, reconsidering, testing, and sometimes rejecting his earlier opinions constitutes his legacy more than his ideas on particular points of policy.

When he discovered that there were too few young noblemen to staff governmental positions, he worked to make it easier for boys outside the noble families to gain higher education, and gave them the possibility, eventually, to be raised to the nobility themselves. He could therefore be considered the father of Swedish meritocracy.

Oxenstierna was also a supporter of mercantilism and a believer in immigration and free enterprise.

In Germany, Oxenstierna became a fear-evoking character in a derived version of the popular German lullaby Schlaf, Kindlein, Schlaf!, in which he is referred to as "Ochsenstern".

Opinions about Oxenstierna
Dutch jurist and philosopher Hugo Grotius considered Oxenstierna "the greatest man of the century". French Cardinal Richelieu called him "an inexhaustible source of fine advice", while Richelieu's successor, Cardinal Mazarin, said that if all ministers of Europe were on the same ship, the helm would be handed to Oxenstierna. Pope Urban VIII claimed that Oxenstierna was one of the most excellent men the world had seen.

Quotation
"Do you not know, my son, with how very little wisdom the world is governed?" (in a letter to his son Johan written in 1648; in the original Latin it reads: An nescis, mi fili, quantilla prudentia mundus regatur?). Although attributed to Cardinal Richelieu as well, this is probably the most famous Swedish quotation in the English-speaking world. The words were intended to encourage his son, a delegate to the negotiations that would lead to the Peace of Westphalia, who worried about his ability to hold his own amidst experienced and eminent statesmen and diplomats.

Fictional portrayals

Film and TV 
Oxenstierna has been portrayed on the stage and on the screen several times, mainly due to his role as mentor and guardian to the enigmatic Queen Christina. He was played by Lewis Stone in Rouben Mamoulian's 1933 Hollywood movie Queen Christina, with Greta Garbo as the female lead role, by Cyril Cusack in Anthony Harvey's The Abdication (1974) and by Michael Nyqvist in Mika Kaurismäki's The Girl King (2015).

On stage 
Samuel Ahlgren (1764–1816) played Oxenstierna in Drottning Kristina (1790), by the King Gustav III of Sweden who was an active playwright.

In August Strindberg's 1901 play Kristina, Oxenstierna is portrayed as a cold realist criticising Christina's extravagant lifestyle and her gifts to favourites.

The bass part of Oxenstierna was first performed by Giovanni Carlo Casanova in Jacopo Foroni's 1849 opera Cristina, regina di Svezia.

Literature 
Oxenstierna figures prominently in the Ring of Fire hypernovel by Eric Flint et al. until the fifth main sequence novel 1636: The Saxon Uprising in which he attempts to organize a counter-revolution to restore the supremacy of the aristocrats while Gustav II Adolf is incapacitated, but Gustav Adolf recovers and in chapter 52 Oxenstierna is properly rewarded for his treason, along with three of his staff officers who started to draw their guns.

Games 
The computer strategy game Europa Universalis IV has several in-game events related to Oxenstierna's reforms and regency.

See also
Swedish Empire
Dominions of Sweden
Axel Oxenstierna palace

Notes

External links

The Correspondence of Axel Oxenstierna – at the National Archives of Sweden

1583 births
1654 deaths
People from Enköping Municipality
Axel
Swedish counts
Members of the Privy Council of Sweden
Swedish diplomats
17th-century Swedish politicians
University of Rostock alumni
University of Jena alumni
University of Wittenberg alumni
People of the Swedish Empire
Christina, Queen of Sweden
Swedish people of the Thirty Years' War
Court of Christina, Queen of Sweden
Royal favourites